Kosonsoy also spelled as Kasansay or simply, Kasan, (ancient Kathan) is a city in Namangan Region, Uzbekistan. It is the seat of Kosonsoy District. Kosonsoy is named after the River "Koson" which flows from high mountains of Kyrgyzstan to Turakurgan District (Namangan Region), the word "soy" in Tajik and  means a "brook".

History

Kosonsoy is an ancient place, its first settlements date back to times of Kushan Empire. The word "koson" came out from the word Kushan. Kosonsoy was an essential part of Kushan Empire together with ancient city Akhsikent, near Namangan city. There are still remains of ancient Mug Castle of Kushanids in the north part of the city. In other books is written that the "koson" means "big town" or "strong castle".

Population
Kosonsoy has a population of 50,900 (2016). A vast majority of population in Kosonsoy are Persian speaking Tajiks.

Education
There are five Secondary Special Education Colleges (SSEC) and one Academic Lyceum in Kosonsoy. SSECs include medical college, pedagogical college, transport and communication college, technical college and a few others. There are about 46 secondary schools in Kosonsoy, including two or three Tajik schools and one Russian and Uzbek school.

Environment
Kosonsoy is a mountainous place, and the mountain is as close as 3 km to the centre of district. The river Kosonsoy divides the city into two parts.

Prominent people
Ahmad Kasani, a prominent Muslim scholar/scientist/poet, was born in Kosonsoy, the street of Makhdumi Azam was named after him and there is monument of Makhdumi Azam near the bank of Kosonsoy River, completed in September 2007. Makhdumi Azam Kosoniy was religion teacher (Pir)of Zakhiriddin Muhammad Bobur. Makhdumi Azam Kosoniy wrote books about law of Islam. He was one of the three Azams in the Muslim world. A descendant Afaqi Khojas was very famous in Kashgar (China). Boborahim Mashrab (Shoh Mashrab) was taught by Offokkhoja and he was Mashrab's religion teacher . Mashrab was his student (murid).

References

Populated places in Namangan Region
Cities in Uzbekistan